The 2008 Rallye Deutschland was the tenth round of the 2008 World Rally Championship season. The event ran from August 15 to August 17 and was won by Sébastien Loeb for the seventh consecutive year.

The rally marked the first time a driver had won a WRC event seven times in a row, and the second time a driver had won the same event seven times during his career, after Marcus Grönholm's seven wins in the Rally Finland. Loeb's teammate Dani Sordo took second place, eventually starting a series of three double wins for the Citroën Total World Rally Team.

Stobart M-Sport Ford driver François Duval beat factory Ford driver Mikko Hirvonen to the last podium place. Subaru's Petter Solberg and Chris Atkinson took the following positions, and Henning Solberg edged out Urmo Aava to take two points for seventh place. In the Junior World Rally Championship, Sébastien Ogier closed in on the title with his third win of the season.

Gigi Galli retired after crashing heavily on the fifth stage and fracturing his left femur. The recovery was expected to take five months, and he missed the five last rallies of the season.

Results

Championship standings after the event

Drivers' championship

Manufacturers' championship

References

External links
 

Deutschland
2008
Rally Deutschland